{{DISPLAYTITLE:C16H12O4}}
The molecular formula C16H12O4 (molar mass: 268.26 g/mol, exact mass: 268.073559 u) may refer to:

 3-Hydroxy-4'-methoxyflavone, a flavonol
 Formononetin, an isoflavone
 Isoformononetin (4'-hydroxy-7-methoxyisoflavone), an isoflavone
 Pratol, a flavone
 Techtochrysin, a flavone

Molecular formulas